Azar is the ninth month of the Solar Hijri calendar, the official calendar of Iran and Afghanistan. Azar has thirty days. It begins in November and ends in December by the Gregorian calendar. Azar corresponds to the Tropical Astrological month of Sagittarius.

Azar is the third month of autumn, and is followed by Dey.

The name is derived from Atar,  the Zoroastrian concept of holy fire.

Events 
 5 - 1296 - the National Hockey League (NHL), the successor to the National Hockey Association (NHA), is founded. Its first games were held on 27 Azar.
 9 - 1297 - Union of Transylvania with Romania
 6 - 1306 - Macy's New York employees march on Thanksgiving Day, making this parade a precursor to the modern day Macy's Thanksgiving Day Parade.
 16 - 1320 - Bombing of Pearl Harbor, beginning the Pacific War
 17 - 1320 - President Franklin Roosevelt delivers his Day of Infamy speech to Congress, urging it to declare war against Japan
 25 - 1368 - Romanian Revolution begins with the police attack at an anti-government rally in Timișoara. 
 20 - 1372 - Highland Towers tragedy in Malaysia
 6 - 1387 - Mumbai attacks

Deaths 

 1 — 1342 — John F. Kennedy, 35th President of the United States

Observances 
 Thanksgiving Day (United States) - 1st Thursday of Azar
 Black Friday in the United States (shopping holiday, also marked in most other countries) - 1st Friday of Azar
 Small Business Saturday in the United States - 1st Saturday of Azar
 Cyber Monday - 2nd Monday of Azar
 Giving Tuesday - 2nd Tuesday of Azar
 Small Business Saturday (UK) - 2nd Saturday of Azar
 Anniversary of the formation of the National Hockey League - 5 or 6 Azar
 Azarnegan and Great Union Day (Romania) - 10 Azar
 Iranian Students' Day - 16 Azar
 Conception of the Theotokos - 16 or 17 Azar
 Pearl Harbor Day - 17 or 18 Azar
 Victory Day (Bangladesh) - 25-26 Azar
 Black Friday in the United Kingdom - Last Friday of Azar, may be occasionally celebrated on the first Friday of Dey to match the date in the Gregorian calendar (held every last Friday before Christmas in the Gregorian)
 Yaldā Night - 31 Azar

References 

Months of the Iranian calendar